Final results of the tennis competition at the 1924 Summer Olympics in Paris, France. After the 1924 Olympics, the tennis competition would be dropped until 1988. The mixed doubles competition did not return until the 2012 Olympics.

Schedule

Medal summary

Events

Medal table

Participating nations
There were 124 tennis players from 27 countries.

References

External links
 International Olympic Committee medal database
 ITF, 2008 Olympic Tennis Event Media Guide

 
1924 Summer Olympics events
1924
Olympics
1924 Olympics
Tennis in Paris
1924 in French tennis